Egils, or Egīls, is a Latvian masculine given name and may refer to:
Egils Bojārs (born 1968), Latvian bobsledder
Egils Helmanis (born 1971), Latvian politician and close combat instructor
Egils Levits (born 1955), Latvian judge, political scientist, lawyer and the President of Latvia
Egīls Tēbelis (born 1972), Latvian hurdler.

References

Latvian masculine given names